Sar Bag-e Juzuiyeh (also Romanized as Sar Bag-e Jūzūīyeh) is a village in Deh Bakri Rural District, in the Central District of Bam County, Kerman Province, Iran. At the 2006 census, its population was 15, in 4 families.

References 

Populated places in Bam County